Heinrich Adam Friedrich Czolbe (30 December 1819, Katzke bei Danzig (now, a village of Kaczki; pl) - 19 February 1873, Königsberg) was a German physician and materialist philosopher.

Literary works 
 Neue Darstellung des Sensualismus, 1855
 Entstehung des Selbstbewußtseins. Eine Antwort an Herrn Professor Lotze, Leipzig 1856 (PDF)
 Die Grenzen und der Ursprung des menschlichen Erkentniss, 1865

Further reading 
 Lange, F.A. (1877). Logische Studien. Ein Beitrag zur Neubegründung der formalen Logik und der Erkenntnisstheorie. Iserlohn: J. Baedeker; the manuscript was completed for publication before his death.
Gregory, F. Scientific Materialism in Nineteenth Century Germany.  Dordrecht.

1819 births
1873 deaths
19th-century German physicians
German philosophers
People from West Prussia
German male writers